Paula Daniela Ugarte (born 10 January 1987) is an Argentine footballer who plays as a forward for Maccabi Kishronot Hadera and the Argentina women's national team.

References

External links

1987 births
Living people
Argentine women's footballers
Women's association football forwards
UAI Urquiza (women) players
Associação Ferroviária de Esportes (women) players
Hapoel Petah Tikva F.C. (women) players
Győri ETO FC players
Argentina women's international footballers
Argentine expatriate women's footballers
Argentine expatriate sportspeople in Brazil
Expatriate women's footballers in Brazil
Argentine expatriate sportspeople in Israel
Expatriate women's footballers in Israel
Argentine expatriate sportspeople in Hungary
Expatriate women's footballers in Hungary